Horton Park is a cricket ground in Blenheim, Marlborough, New Zealand. The ground is on Redwood Street, on the southern edge of Blenheim's central business district.

The reserve, formerly known as the Domain, was named Horton Park in 1907 after Thomas Horton, the local who had ensured the use of the land as a recreational reserve in the late 19th century. The Marlborough cricket team moved its home ground to Horton Park in late 1919 after the nearby Wairau club's ground was sold for development. The first club match there took place on 22 November 1919. Marlborough played for the first time there a month later, a match against the Thorndon club from Wellington.

Horton Park held its first first-class match in 1972 when Central Districts played Northern Districts in the 1972/73 Plunket Shield.  Over the following thirty years, Central Districts played nine further first-class matches there, the last of which came against Auckland in the 2002/03 State Championship.  The first List A match held there came when Central Districts played Otago in the 1977/78 Gillette Cup.  Two further List A matches have been played there, with Central Districts playing Northern Districts in the 1980/81 and 1993/94 Shell Cup.

The ground is the headquarters and home ground of the Marlborough Cricket Association.

References

External links
Horton Park at ESPNcricinfo
Horton Park at CricketArchive
Horton Park at Marlborough District Council website

Cricket grounds in New Zealand
Sport in Blenheim, New Zealand
Buildings and structures in Blenheim, New Zealand